Arkansas Symphony Orchestra is a professional orchestra based in Little Rock, Arkansas.

Concert venues
Witherspoon Auditorium at Arkansas Tech University
Albert Pike Masonic Center in downtown Little Rock
Robinson Center
Garvan Woodland Gardens

Note:This list is not fully complete.

History
The Arkansas Symphony Orchestra was founded in 1966. 
David Itkin was the conductor of the orchestra from 1993 to 2010. 
In February 2012, George Takei performed with the group in a Holocaust memorial.

See also
Music of Arkansas

References

External links
Arkansas Symphony Orchestra | Philip Mann, Music Director
Arkansas Symphony Orchestra - Encyclopedia of Arkansas
Romantic Valentine's Date with the Arkansas Symphony Orchestra - KATV - Breaking News, Weather and Razorback Sports

American orchestras
Musical groups established in 1966
Performing arts in Arkansas
Musical groups from Little Rock, Arkansas
1966 establishments in Arkansas